Atia Boggs, also known as INK, is an American singer, songwriter, guitarist, and producer. She has worked with Chris Brown, Justin Bieber, Monica, and Beyoncé, among others.

Songwriting and production credits

Credits are courtesy of Discogs, Tidal, Apple Music, and AllMusic.

Guest appearances

Awards and nominations

References 

African-American songwriters
Year of birth missing (living people)
Living people